Saral in Kurdistan Iran may refer to:
 Saral-e Olya, West Azerbaijan Province
 Saral-e Sofla, West Azerbaijan Province
 Saral District, in Kurdistan Province
 Saral Rural District, in Kurdistan Province